In epidemiology, an infection is said to be endemic in a specific population or populated place when that infection is constantly maintained at a baseline level without extra infections being brought into the group as a result of travel or similar means.  An endemic disease always has a steady, predictable number of people getting sick, but that number can be high (hyperendemic) or low (hypoendemic), and the disease can be severe or mild. Also, a disease that is usually endemic can become epidemic.

For example, chickenpox is endemic (steady state) in the United Kingdom, but malaria is not. Every year, there are a few cases of malaria reported in the UK, but these do not lead to sustained transmission in the population due to the lack of a suitable vector (mosquitoes of the genus Anopheles).  Consequently, the number of people infected by malaria is too variable to be called endemic.  However, the number of people who get chickenpox in the UK varies little from year to year, so chickenpox is considered endemic in the UK.

Mathematical determination 

For an infection that relies on person-to-person transmission, to be endemic, each person who becomes infected with the disease must pass it on to one other person on average. Assuming a completely susceptible population, that means that the basic reproduction number (R0) of the infection must equal one. In a population with some immune individuals, the basic reproduction number multiplied by the proportion of susceptible individuals in the population (S) must be one. This takes account of the probability of each individual to whom the disease may be transmitted being susceptible to it, effectively discounting the immune sector of the population. So, for a disease to be in an endemic steady state or endemic equilibrium, it holds that

 

In this way, the infection neither dies out nor does the number of infected people increase exponentially but the infection is said to be in an endemic steady state. An infection that starts as an epidemic will eventually either die out (with the possibility of it resurging in a theoretically predictable cyclical manner) or reach the endemic steady state, depending on a number of factors, including the virulence of the disease and its mode of transmission.

If a disease is in an endemic steady state in a population, the relation above allows us to estimate the R0 (an important parameter) of a particular infection. This in turn can be fed into a mathematical model for the epidemic. Based on the reproduction number, we can define the epidemic waves, such as the first wave, second wave, etc. for COVID-19 in different regions and countries.

Misuse 
While it might be common to say that AIDS is endemic in some countries, meaning that it is regularly found in an area, this is a use of the word in its etymological, rather than epidemiological or ecological, form.

Some in the public wrongly assume that endemic COVID-19 means the disease would necessarily be mild. Endemic COVID-19 could be mild if previously acquired immunity reduces the risk of death and disability during future infections, but in itself endemicity only means that there will be a steady, predictable number of sick people.

Related terms

Categories of endemic diseases 
Holoendemic  An endemic disease with an extremely high rate of infection, especially a disease that infects nearly everyone early in life, so that nearly all adults have developed some level of immunity. 
Hyperendemic  An endemic disease with a high rate of infection, especially one affecting people of all ages equally.
Mesoendemic  An endemic disease with a moderate rate of infection.  This term is often used to describe the prevalence of malaria in a local area, with 10 to 50% of children showing evidence of prior infection being considered a moderate level for that disease.
Hypoendemic  An endemic disease with a low rate of infection.  Typhoid fever is a hypoendemic disease in the US.

Categories for non-endemic diseases 
Sporadic  A disease that appears occasionally, but, unlike endemic disease, is not always present at a steady and predictable level.
Epidemic  A new disease that is spreading or a previously endemic disease whose infection rate is increasing significantly.  Seasonal flu frequently appears as an epidemic.
Outbreak  An epidemic, especially one affecting a very small area, such as the people in one town or attending a single event.  The 2019–2020 measles outbreaks showed a normally endemic disease causing an epidemic outbreak, primarily among unvaccinated people.
Pandemic  An epidemic affecting a very large part of the world, generally multiple countries or multiple continents.  Seasonal flu is sometimes a global pandemic.

Examples 
This is a short, incomplete list of some infections that are usually considered endemic:

 Common cold
 Lassa fever
 Malaria
 Polio
 Rotavirus
 Hepatitis C
 Measles

Smallpox was an endemic disease until it was eradicated through vaccination.

Etymology 

See also 

 Syndemic – when two or more public health problems coincide and exacerbate each other
 Eradication of infectious diseases – when an infection declines until it no longer exists
 Vaccine-preventable diseases

References

External links 
 

Epidemiology
Prevention